Engehaugen Church is a parish church of the Church of Norway in Gjøvik Municipality in Innlandet county, Norway. It is located in the town of Gjøvik. It is the church for the Engehaugen parish which is part of the Toten prosti (deanery) in the Diocese of Hamar. The red, wooden church was built in a fan-shaped design in 1985 using plans drawn up by the architect Jan Arne Frydenlund. The church seats about 156 people.

History
The building was first built in 1985 as a facility for people who are developmentally disabled. During the 1990s, this program was discontinued and the building became available. In 1994, the parish purchased the building and converted it into a church. The gymnasium was converted into the nave. The church was consecrated by Bishop Rosemarie Köhn in 1994.

See also
List of churches in Hamar

References

Gjøvik
Churches in Innlandet
Churches in Toten Deanery
Fan-shaped churches in Norway
Wooden churches in Norway
20th-century Church of Norway church buildings
Churches completed in 1985
1994 establishments in Norway